Luke Traynor (born 6 July 1993) is a British long-distance runner.

In 2018, he competed in the men's half marathon at the 2018 IAAF World Half Marathon Championships held in Valencia, Spain. He finished in 38th place. In the same year, he also competed at the 2018 European 10,000m Cup.

In 2019, he competed in the senior men's race at the 2019 IAAF World Cross Country Championships held in Aarhus, Denmark. He finished in 107th place.

In June 2020, he was banned from competitive sports for two years after cocaine use during a night out in Glasgow. The ban lasts from 27 May 2019 till 26 May 2021.

References

External links 
 

Living people
1993 births
Place of birth missing (living people)
Scottish male long-distance runners
Scottish male cross country runners
Doping cases in athletics
Scottish sportspeople in doping cases
Tulsa Golden Hurricane men's track and field athletes